The Chicago Society of Artists is a non-profit organization. The "CSA is the oldest continuing association of artists in the United States. Since its inception and incorporation in 1889, the Chicago Society of Artists has had two primary objectives – the advancement of art in the Chicago area and cultivation of the production and display of member art works".

Notable members
 
 Gertrude Abercrombie
 Frances Badger
 Belle Baranceanu
 Orval Caldwell
 Gustaf Dalstrom
 Ruth VanSickle Ford
 Todros Geller
 C. Bertram Hartman
 Natalie Smith Henry
 John Christen Johansen
 Edwin Boyd Johnson
 Paul Klein
 Joseph Kleitsch
 Beatrice S. Levy
 LeRoy Neiman
 Edgar Alwin Payne
 Leo Segedin
 John Vanderpoel
 James F. Walker
 Frances Farrand Dodge

References

Arts organizations based in Illinois
American artist groups and collectives
Non-profit organizations based in Chicago
Arts organizations established in 1889
1889 establishments in Illinois